Garrett is a surname and given name of Germanic and of Old French origins. It is one of the many baptismal surnames to have been derived from the popular given names of Gerardus, Gerard and Gerald in 12th-century England. Both of these names were taken to Britain by the conquering Normans and are the Old French versions of ancient Germanic personal names. Although Garrett remains predominantly only a last name in the UK and Ireland, elsewhere in the English-speaking world it is also a common first name (e.g. in the United States).

Other surnames derived from Gerardus, Gerard and Gerald include: Gerrard, Garratt, Garret, Garred, Garrad, Garrard, Garrod, Jarrett, Jared, Jarratt, Jarrard, and Jerrold.

People with the given name
Gerald FitzGerald, 8th Earl of Kildare (fl. 1477–1513), aka "Garrett the Great", Lord Deputy of Ireland
Garrett Adelstein (born 1986), American professional poker player
Garrett Arbelbide (1909–1983), American football and baseball player and football coach
Garrett Atkins (born 1979), American former Major League Baseball third baseman
Garrett Birkhoff (1911–1996), American mathematician
Garrett Bradbury (born 1995), American football player
Garrett Bradley (politician) (born 1970), current representative in the Massachusetts House of Representatives for the 3rd Plymouth district
Garrett Brock Trapnell (1938–1993), con man, bank robber, and aircraft hijacker
Garrett Broshuis (born 1981), former professional baseball player
Garrett Brown (born 1942), American cinematographer
Garrett Brown, Jr. (born 1943), former federal judge and attorney
Garrett Burnett (born 1975), former professional ice hockey player
Garrett Byrne (Irish politician) (1829–1897), Irish nationalist
Garrett Byrnes (born 1971), American composer
Garrett Caldwell (born 1973), American-born Canadian former soccer player
Garrett Camp (born 1978), Canadian entrepreneur
Garrett Caples (born 1972), American poet
Garrett Celek (born 1988), American football tight end
Garrett Clayton (born 1991), American actor, singer, and dancer
Garrett Cochran (1876–1918), American football player and coach
Garrett Davis (1801–1872), U.S. Senator and Representative from Kentucky
Garrett Dickerson (born 1995), American football player
Garrett Dillon (1640–1696), Irish judge, politician and soldier
Garrett Droppers (1860–1927), American academic and diplomat
Garrett Eckbo (1910–2000), American landscape architect
Garrett Epps (born 1950), American legal scholar, novelist, and journalist
Garrett Festerling (born 1986), professional ice hockey forward
Garret FitzGerald (1926–2011), Taoiseach of Ireland from 1981 to 1982 and 1982 to 1987
Garrett Ford, Jr. (born 1970), American football running back
Garrett Ford, Sr. (born 1945), assistant athletics director at West Virginia University
Garrett Fort (1900–1945), American short story writer, playwright, and Hollywood screenwriter
Garrett Gardner, American singer and songwriter
Garrett Giemont (born 1959), strength and conditioning coach
Garrett Gilbert (born 1991), American football quarterback
Garrett Gilkey (born 1990), American football offensive guard
Garrett Glaser (born 1953), retired American news reporter
Garrett K. Gomez (born 1972), American thoroughbred jockey
Garrett Graff (born 1981), American editor-in-chief and instructor
Garrett Graham (born 1986), American football tight end
Garrett Grayson (born 1991), American football quarterback
Garrett Gruener, founder of Ask.com and a co-founder of Alta Partners
Garrett Hammond, American drummer
Garrett Hardin (1915–2003), American ecologist
Garrett Hartley (born 1986), American football placekicker
Garrett Heath (born 1985), American middle-distance and distance runner
Garrett Hedlund (born 1984), American actor
Garrett Hines (born 1969), American bobsledder
Garrett Hongo (born 1941), Yonsei, fourth-generation Japanese American academic and poet
Garrett Howard (1899–1995), Irish hurler
Garrett Jernigan, American physicist and astronomer
Garrett Johnson (born 1984), American shot putter
Garrett Jones (born 1981), American professional baseball outfielder and first baseman
Garrett Kelleher, non-executive director of Lightstream Pictures
Garrett Klugh (born 1974), American rower
Garrett Lerner, American television writer and producer
Garrett Lewis (1935–2013), American set decorator
Garrett Lindholm (born 1988), American football placekicker
Antony Garrett Lisi (born 1968), American theoretical physicist
Garrett List (1943–2019), American trombonist, vocalist, and composer
Garrett Love (born 1988), Republican member of the Kansas Senate
Garrett Lowney (born 1979), American Greco-Roman wrestler
Garrett Lucash (born 1978), American pair skater
Garrett Lynch (born 1977), Irish new media artist
Garrett MacKeen (born 1994), Canadian ice dancer
Garrett Mason (born 1985), American politician
Garrett Mattingly (1900–1962), professor of European history at Columbia University
Garrett McGhin (born 1995), American football player
Garrett McIntyre (born 1984), American football linebacker
Garrett McNamara (born 1967), American professional big wave surfer and extreme waterman
Garrett Miller (born 1977), American rower
Garrett Miller (politician) (1770–1840), Nova Scotia politician
Garrett Mills (born 1983), American football tight end
Garrett Mitchell (ice hockey) (born 1991), Canadian ice hockey forward
Garrett Mock (born 1983), American former professional baseball pitcher
Garrett Morgan (1877–1963), African-American inventor; created the safety hood smoke protection device and the traffic signal
Garrett Morris (born 1937), African-American comedian/actor and Saturday Night Live alumnus
Garrett Neff (born 1984), American model
Garrett Nussmeier (born 2002), American football player
Garrett Oliver (born 1962), American brewer and beer author
Garrett Olson (born 1983), American former professional baseball pitcher
Garrett Phelan (born 1965), artist from Dublin, Ireland
Garrett J. Pendergrast (1802–1862), officer in the US Navy; served at the beginning of the American Civil War
Garrett Raboin (born 1985), retired American professional ice hockey player
Garrett Reisman (born 1968), American astronaut
Garrett Reynolds (born 1987), American football guard and tackle
Garrett Richards (born 1988), American professional baseball pitcher
Garrett Richter (born 1950), Republican member of the Florida Senate
Garrett Rivas (born 1985), American former football kicker
Garrett Roe (born 1988), American professional ice hockey left winger
Garrett Scott (born 1991), American football offensive tackle
Garrett P. Serviss (1851–1929), American astronomer, popularizer of astronomy, and early science fiction writer
Garrett Sinnott (born 1987), Irish sportsperson
Garrett Smith (born 1967), former U.S. soccer defender
Garrett Stafford (born 1980), professional ice hockey defenceman
Garrett Stephenson (born 1972), retired Major League Baseball pitcher
Garrett Stubbs (born 1993), American baseball catcher
Garrett Swasey (1971–2015), American ice skater and slain police officer
Garrett Temple (born 1986), American professional basketball guard
Garrett Uhlenbrock (born 1964), punk rock musician and songwriter
Garrett Wang (born 1968), American actor
Garrett Weber-Gale (born 1985), American swimmer
Garrett Williams (born 2001), American football player
Garrett Willis (born 1973), American professional golfer
Garrett Wilson (born 2000), American football wide receiver
Garrett Wilson (ice hockey) (born 1991), Canadian professional ice hockey winger  
Garrett L. Withers (1884–1953), Democrat, represented Kentucky
Garrett Wittels (born 1990), American baseball player
Garrett Wolfe (born 1984), American former football running back
Garrett Zuercher (born 1979), American deaf actor, director, and playwright

People with the surname
Abraham Ellison Garrett (1830–1907), American politician
Almeida Garrett (1799–1854), Portuguese poet, playwright, novelist, and politician
Alvin Garrett (born 1956), American football player
Amir Garrett (born 1992), American baseball player
Amos Garrett (born 1941), American-Canadian musician and author
Andrew Garrett (explorer) (1823–1887), American explorer, naturalist, and illustrator
Andrew Garrett (linguist), American linguist
Augustus Garrett (1801–1848), mayor of Chicago, Illinois from 1843 to 1844 and 1845 to 1846
Betty Garrett (1919–2011), American actress, comedian, singer, and dancer 
Bill Garrett (basketball) (1929–1974), American basketball player, coach, and college administrator
Billy Garrett (1933–1999), American racing driver
Bobby Garrett (1932-1987), American football player
Brad Garrett (born 1960), American actor and comedian
Braxton Garrett (born 1997), American baseball player
Carl Garrett (born 1947), American football player
Charles Garrett (1901–1968), English cricketer and Royal Navy officer

Cliff Garrett (1908–1963), American founder of Garrett AiResearch
David Garrett (musician) (born 1980), German violinist
David Garrett (politician) (born 1958), New Zealand Member of Parliament
Denis Garrett (1906–1989), British mycologist and plant pathologist
Diante Garrett (born 1988), American basketball player for Ironi Ness Ziona of the Israeli Basketball Premier League
Dickie Garrett (1865–1908), Welsh rugby union player
Dub Garrett (1925–1976), American football player
Dudley Garrett (1924–1944), Canadian ice hockey player
Edmund H. Garrett (1853–1929), American painter, illustrator, and author
Elizabeth Garrett (1963–2016), American academic administrator
Emma Garrett (c. 1846–1893), American educator and activist
Finis J. Garrett (1875–1956), American politician
Franklin Garrett (1906–2000), American historian
Garet Garrett (1878–1954), American journalist and author
Geoffrey Garrett, Australian political scientist, dean of the Wharton School of the University of Pennsylvania

Haskell Garrett (born 1998), American football player

Hubert Garrett (1885–1915), Australian-English cricketer, son of Tom Garrett
Jack Garrett (1914–1977), Irish politician
James P. Garrett (1922–2015), American attorney in Oklahoma, last served on the Oklahoma Court of Civil Appeals 
Jason Garrett (born 1966), American football player and coach
Jesse James Garrett, American user experience designer
John W. Garrett (1820–1884), American businessman and philanthropist
Joseph Garrett (born 1990), known online as stampylonghead, British YouTube personality
Kenny Garrett (born 1960), American jazz saxophonist and flautist
Kevin Garrett (born 1980), American football player
Laurie Garrett (born 1951), American science journalist and author
Lee Garrett (born 1948), American singer-songwriter
Leif Garrett (born 1961), American musician and actor
Lesley Garrett (born 1955), English musician and broadcaster
Maureen Garrett (born 1948), American actress

Myles Garrett (born 1994), American football player
Neil Garrett (born 1975), British TV producer/director

Pat Garrett (1850–1908), American lawman who killed Billy the Kid
Patsy Garrett (1921–2015), American actress and singer
Peter Garrett (born 1953), Australian musician, environmentalist, and politician
R. M. Garrett (1807–1885), American politician
Randall Garrett (1927–1987), American author
Ray Garrett, Jr. (1920–1980), American lawyer
Raymond Garrett (1900–1994), Australian military officer
Reed Garrett (born 1993), American baseball player
Richard Garrett (author) (1920–2008), English author
Richard Garrett (1755–1839), English manufacturer
Robert Garrett (1875–1961), American Olympic athlete
Scott Garrett (born 1959), American politician
Sean Garrett (born 1979), American singer-songwriter and producer
Siedah Garrett (born 1958), American singer-songwriter
Snuff Garrett (1938–2015), American record producer
Static Major, birth name of Stephen Garrett (1974–2008), American singer-songwriter and producer, member of the group Playa
Stone Garrett (born 1995), American baseball player
Susie Garrett (1929–2002), African American actress and singer
Thomas Garrett (1789–1871), American abolitionist
Tom Garrett (1858–1943), Australian cricketer
Tommy Garrett (footballer) (1926–2006), English footballer
Tracy L. Garrett, American marine general
Umi Garrett (born 2000), American pianist
Wendell Garrett (1929–2012), Americana expert and historian

Fictional characters
 Edna Garrett, a character on the TV series The Facts of Life and Diff'rent Strokes
 Kelly Garrett (Charlie's Angels), a character on the 1976–81 TV series Charlie's Angels
 Garrett, a character from the Twilight book and film series
 The eponymous protagonist of Glen Cook's Garrett P.I. series of fantasy novels.
 Garrett (character), from the Thief video game series

See also
 
Garratt (surname)
Jarrett (surname)
Garret (given name)
Garet (disambiguation)

References

English masculine given names
English-language surnames
Germanic masculine given names